Bird Islands Conservation Park is a  protected area in eastern Spencer Gulf, South Australia. In 1991, land additions were made to the park to include the intertidal zone of both islands. In 1999, a larger, mainland section was added to support mangroves, samphire and coastal fringe vegetation.

Vegetation
The two islands forming Bird Islands Conservation Park are fringed by grey mangrove (Avicennia marina ssp. marina) woodlands and chenopod shrublands. A tall open shrubland of coast daisy-bush (Olearia axillaris) and grasslands of introduced species occur on the sandy, higher ground. The mainland section of the park at Warburto Point is similar but with some sandy beach areas backed by dunes supporting coast daisy-bush and various Acacia spp. shrublands. Nine native plant species have been recorded in this park.

Wildlife
Australia is party to international agreements regarding the conservation of migratory birds (Japan-Australia and China-Australia Migratory Bird Agreements) and several of these migrant shorebirds (listed under JAMBA and CAMBA treaties) regularly visit Bird Islands Conservation Park. These are known to include sharp-tailed sandpiper, red knot, red-necked stint, greater sand plover, grey-tailed tattler, Caspian tern and Terek sandpiper.

Additional birds of conservation significance recorded in the park include: Cape Barren goose, lesser sand plover, pied oystercatcher, rock parrot, eastern osprey and fairy tern.

Access
The park can be accessed by car along Warburto Road. The islands can be reached by wading out at low tide or by boat at high tide. Limited 4WD access is available via a network of sandy tracks.

Activities
In keeping with the park's conservation zoning, public use is restricted to low-impact activities compatible with the protection of natural and cultural values. Walking, interpretation and education, scientific research and nature appreciation are permitted using existing tracks and trails within the zone. Kayaking is also possible around Bird Islands. Beach fishing is permitted in the waters off Bird Island Conservation Park, provided it is not occurring within a Marine Park Sanctuary Zone.

Threats
The Government of South Australia's Department of the Environment, Water and Natural Resources has suggested 4WD use should be monitored, as environmental damage can result from driving vehicles on the beach. As the Copper Coast District Council area's human population increases, the impacts from 4WD and other visitor impacts will also increase and will require management.

References

External links
Bird Islands Conservation Park webpage on protected planet

Conservation parks of South Australia
South Australian terrestrial protected areas with a marine zone
Islands of South Australia
Spencer Gulf